The Rofla Gorge is an ancient and narrow section of the river Hinterrhein/Rein Posteriur between Sufers and Andeer in the canton of Graubünden. This narrow gorge was another obstacle on the approach to the two mountain passes Splügen Pass und San Bernardino Pass in addition to the Viamala gorge.

Modern era 

Nowadays the mountains can be crossed on the A13 motorway, opened in 1967, which passes through the San Bernardino Tunnel and is therefore open all year round (whereas both passes were closed in winter). The older, main road passes the hotel at the entrance of the gorge, from where there is a footpath to and under the waterfall. The path was built from 1907 to 1914 by the family who owned the hotel.

See also
 List of highest paved roads in Europe
 List of mountain passes

External links

 Switzerland Sightseeing Roflaschlucht, Graubünden on official tourist board

Canyons and gorges of Switzerland
Landforms of Graubünden
Tourist attractions in Graubünden
Sufers
Andeer